Cyclas is a genus of true weevils.

References

External links 

 

 Cyclas at insectoid.info

Curculionidae genera